HP-505 is a triple reuptake inhibitor that was investigated by Hoechst-Roussel Pharmaceuticals. In mice, HP-505 was a potent inhibitor of tetrabenazine-induced ptosis which may indicate antidepressant activity.

Pharmacology

The inhibitory effect of HP-505 on serotonin reuptake is approximately 1.8 and 3.5 times stronger than on norepinephrine and dopamine, respectively. Subsequent investigations have found that HP-505 acts on presynaptic dopamine transporters and is devoid of anticholinergic effects.

Synthesis
The N-methylated analog is called HP-365 [59142-29-9].

An older synthesis is available, although more modern methods exist now:

References 

Serotonin–norepinephrine–dopamine reuptake inhibitors
Drugs not assigned an ATC code
Piperidines
Isobenzofurans
Spiro compounds